The 2022–23 UEFA Champions League qualifying phase and play-off round began on 21 June and ended on 24 August 2022.

A total of 52 teams competed in the qualifying system of the 2022–23 UEFA Champions League, which included the qualifying phase and the play-off round, with 42 teams in Champions Path and 10 teams in League Path. The six winners in the play-off round (four from Champions Path, two from League Path) advanced to the group stage, to join the 26 teams that enter in the group stage.

Times are CEST (UTC+2), as listed by UEFA (local times, if different, are in parentheses).

Teams

Champions Path
The Champions Path included all league champions which did not qualify directly for the group stage, and consisted of the following rounds:
Preliminary round (4 teams playing one-legged semi-finals and final): 4 teams which entered in this round.
First qualifying round (30 teams): 29 teams which entered in this round, and 1 winner of the preliminary round.
Second qualifying round (20 teams): 5 teams which entered in this round, and 15 winners of the first qualifying round.
Third qualifying round (12 teams): 2 teams which entered in this round, and 10 winners of the second qualifying round.
Play-off round (8 teams): 2 teams which entered in this round, and 6 winners of the third qualifying round.

All teams eliminated from the Champions Path entered either the Europa League or the Europa Conference League:
The 3 losers of the preliminary round and 13 losers of the first qualifying round entered the Europa Conference League Champions Path second qualifying round.
The 2 drawn losers of the first qualifying round entered the Europa Conference League Champions Path third qualifying round.
The 10 losers of the second qualifying round entered the Europa League Champions Path third qualifying round
The 6 losers of the third qualifying round entered the Europa League play-off round.
The 4 losers of the play-off round entered the Europa League group stage.

Below are the participating teams of the Champions Path (with their 2022 UEFA club coefficients), grouped by their starting rounds.

League Path
The League Path included all league non-champions which did not qualify directly for the group stage, and consisted of the following rounds:
Second qualifying round (4 teams): 4 teams which entered in this round.
Third qualifying round (8 teams): 6 teams which entered in this round, and 2 winners of the second qualifying round.
Play-off round (4 teams): 4 winners of the third qualifying round.

All teams eliminated from the League Path entered the Europa League:
The 2 losers of the second qualifying round entered the Main Path third qualifying round.
The 4 losers of the third qualifying round and the 2 losers of the play-off round entered the group stage.

Below are the participating teams of the League Path (with their 2022 UEFA club coefficients), grouped by their starting rounds.

Format
Each tie, apart from the preliminary round, was played over two legs, with each team playing one leg at home. The team that scored more goals on aggregate over the two legs advanced to the next round. If the aggregate score was level at the end of normal time of the second leg, extra time was played, and if the same amount of goals were scored by both teams during extra time, the tie was decided by a penalty shoot-out.

In the preliminary round, the semi-finals and final were played as a single match hosted by one of the participating teams. If the score was level at the end of normal time, extra time was played, and if the same amount of goals were scored by both teams during extra time, the tie was decided by a penalty shoot-out.

The 2022–23 season saw the video assistant referee (VAR) used for the first time during the qualification phase following its introduction in the third qualifying round.

In the draws for each round, teams were seeded based on their UEFA club coefficients at the beginning of the season, with the teams divided into seeded and unseeded pots containing the same number of teams. A seeded team was drawn against an unseeded team, with the order of legs (or the administrative "home" team in the preliminary round matches) in each tie decided by draw. As the identity of the winners of the previous round was not known at the time of the draws, the seeding was carried out under the assumption that the team with the higher coefficient of an undecided tie advanced to this round, which means if the team with the lower coefficient was to advance, it simply took the seeding of its opponent. Prior to the draws, UEFA formed "groups" in accordance with the principles set by the Club Competitions Committee, but they were purely for convenience of the draw and did not resemble any real groupings in the sense of the competition. Teams from associations with political conflicts as decided by UEFA should not be drawn into the same tie. After the draws, the order of legs of a tie could be reversed by UEFA due to scheduling or venue conflicts.

Schedule
The schedule of the competition was as follows (all draws were held at the UEFA headquarters in Nyon, Switzerland).

Preliminary round
The preliminary round consisted of two semi-finals on 21 June 2022 and the final on 24 June 2022. The draw for the preliminary round was held on 7 June 2022.

Seeding

A total of four teams played in the preliminary round. Seeding of teams was based on their 2022 UEFA club coefficients, with two seeded teams and two unseeded teams in the semi-finals. The matches took place at Víkingsvöllur in Reykjavík, Iceland so the first team drawn in each tie in the semi-finals, and also the final (between the two winners of the semi-finals, whose identity was not known at the time of draw), would be the "home" team for administrative purposes.

Bracket

Summary
The preliminary round matches consisted of two semi-finals on 21 June 2022 and the final on 24 June 2022.

The winner of the preliminary round final advanced to the first qualifying round. The losers of the semi-finals and final were transferred to the Europa Conference League Champions Path second qualifying round.

|+Semi-finals

|}

|+Final

|}

Semi-finals

Final

First qualifying round

The draw for the first qualifying round was held on 14 June 2022.

Seeding
A total of 30 teams played in the first qualifying round: 29 teams which enter in this round, and 1 winner of the preliminary round. Seeding of teams was based on their 2022 UEFA club coefficients. For the winner of the preliminary round, whose identity was not known at the time of draw, the club coefficient of the highest-ranked remaining team was used. Prior to the draw, UEFA formed three groups of five seeded teams and five unseeded teams in accordance with the principles set by the Club Competitions Committee. The first team drawn in each tie would be the home team of the first leg.

Notes

Summary
The first legs were played on 5 and 6 July, and the second legs were played on 12 and 13 July 2022.

The winners of the ties advanced to the Champions Path second qualifying round. The losers were transferred to the Europa Conference League Champions Path second qualifying round.

|}
Notes

Matches

2–2 on aggregate. Pyunik won 4–3 on penalties.

Maribor won 2–0 on aggregate.

Ludogorets Razgrad won 3–0 on aggregate.

F91 Dudelange won 3–1 on aggregate.

Ferencváros won 5–1 on aggregate.

Malmö FF won 6–5 on aggregate.

Žalgiris won 2–1 on aggregate.

2–2 on aggregate. HJK won 5–4 on penalties.

Bodø/Glimt won 4–3 on aggregate.

Linfield won 2–1 on aggregate.

Shamrock Rovers won 3–0 on aggregate.

Qarabağ won 5–2 on aggregate.

Shkupi won 3–2 on aggregate.

Sheriff Tiraspol won 1–0 on aggregate.

Slovan Bratislava won 2–1 on aggregate.

Second qualifying round

The draw for the second qualifying round was held on 15 June 2022.

Seeding
A total of 24 teams played in the second qualifying round. They were divided into two paths:
Champions Path (20 teams): 5 teams which enter in this round, and 15 winners of the first qualifying round.
League Path (4 teams): 4 teams which enter in this round.
Seeding of teams was based on their 2022 UEFA club coefficients. For the winners of the first qualifying round, whose identity was not known at the time of draw, the club coefficient of the highest-ranked remaining team in each tie was used. Prior to the draw, UEFA formed three groups for the champions path draw in accordance with the principles set by the Club Competitions Committee: two groups that produce three ties each (Groups 1 and 2) and one with four ties (Group 3). The first team drawn in each tie would be the home team of the first leg.

Notes

Summary

The first legs were played on 19 and 20 July, and the second legs were played on 26 and 27 July 2022.

The winners of the ties advanced to the third qualifying round of their respective path. The Champions Path losers were transferred to the Europa League Champions Path third qualifying round, while the League Path losers were transferred to the Europa League Main Path third qualifying round.

|+Champions Path

|}

|+League Path

|}

Champions Path

Ferencváros won 5–3 on aggregate.

Dinamo Zagreb won 3–2 on aggregate.

Qarabağ won 5–4 on aggregate.

Viktoria Plzeň won 7–1 on aggregate.

Bodø/Glimt won 8–1 on aggregate.

Žalgiris won 3–0 on aggregate.

Ludogorets Razgrad won 4–2 on aggregate.

Sheriff Tiraspol won 1–0 on aggregate.

Maccabi Haifa won 5–1 on aggregate.

Pyunik won 4–2 on aggregate.

League Path

2–2 on aggregate. Midtjylland won 4–3 on penalties.

Dynamo Kyiv won 2–1 on aggregate.

Third qualifying round

The draw for the third qualifying round was held on 18 July 2022.

Seeding
A total of 20 teams played in the third qualifying round. They were divided into two paths:
Champions Path (12 teams): 2 teams which enter in this round, and 10 winners of the second qualifying round (Champions Path).
League Path (8 teams): 6 teams which enter in this round, and 2 winners of the second qualifying round (League Path).
Seeding of teams was based on their 2022 UEFA club coefficients. For the winners of the second qualifying round, whose identity was not known at the time of draw, the club coefficient of the highest-ranked remaining team in each tie was used. Prior to the draw, UEFA formed two groups of three seeded teams and three unseeded teams in accordance with the principles set by the Club Competitions Committee. The first team drawn in each tie would be the home team of the first leg.

Notes

Summary

The first legs were played on 2 and 3 August, and the second legs were played on 9 August 2022. 

The winners of the ties advanced to the play-off round of their respective path. The Champions Path losers were transferred to the Europa League play-off round, while the League Path losers were transferred to the Europa League group stage.

|+Champions Path

|}

|+League Path

|}

Champions Path

Maccabi Haifa won 4–2 on aggregate.

Qarabağ won 4–2 on aggregate.

Dinamo Zagreb won 6–3 on aggregate.

Viktoria Plzeň won 4–2 on aggregate.

Bodø/Glimt won 6–1 on aggregate.

Red Star Belgrade won 7–0 on aggregate.

League Path

PSV Eindhoven won 4–3 on aggregate.

Dynamo Kyiv won 3–1 on aggregate.

Rangers won 3–2 on aggregate.

Benfica won 7–2 on aggregate.

Play-off round

The draw for the play-off round was held on 2 August 2022.

Seeding
A total of 12 teams played in the play-off round. They were divided into two paths:
Champions Path (8 teams): 2 teams which entered in this round, and 6 winners of the third qualifying round (Champions Path).
League Path (4 teams): 4 winners of the third qualifying round (League Path).
Seeding of teams was based on their 2022 UEFA club coefficients. For the winners of the third qualifying round, whose identity was not known at the time of draw, the club coefficient of the highest-ranked remaining team in each tie was used. The first team drawn in each tie would be the home team of the first leg.

Notes

Summary

The first legs were played on 16 and 17 August, and the second legs were played on 23 and 24 August 2022. 

The winners of the ties advanced to the group stage. The losers were transferred to the Europa League group stage.

|+Champions Path

|}

|+League Path

|}

Champions Path

Viktoria Plzeň won 2–1 on aggregate.

Dinamo Zagreb won 4–2 on aggregate.

Maccabi Haifa won 5–4 on aggregate.

Copenhagen won 2–1 on aggregate.

League Path

Benfica won 5–0 on aggregate.

Rangers won 3–2 on aggregate.

Notes

References

External links

1
2022-23
June 2022 sports events in Europe
July 2022 sports events in Europe
August 2022 sports events in Europe